Limonia annulata is a species of limoniid crane fly in the family Limoniidae.

References

External links

 

Limoniidae
Articles created by Qbugbot
Insects described in 1758
Taxa named by Carl Linnaeus